Pramod Kumar Sharma is an Indian politician. He was elected to the Chhattisgarh Legislative Assembly from Baloda Bazar in the 2018 Chhattisgarh Legislative Assembly election as a member of the Janta Congress Chhattisgarh.

References

1976 births
Living people
Janta Congress Chhattisgarh politicians
Indian National Congress politicians from Chhattisgarh
People from Baloda Bazar district
Chhattisgarh MLAs 2018–2023